The 1998 Delaware Fightin' Blue Hens football team represented the University of Delaware as a member of the Mid-Atlantic Division of the Atlantic 10 Conference (A-10) during the 1998 NCAA Division I-AA football season. Led by 33rd-year head coach Tubby Raymond, the Fightin' Blue Hens compiled an overall record of 7–4 with a mark of 4–4 in conference play, placing in a three-way tie for second in the A-10's Mid-Atlantic Division. The team played home games at Delaware Stadium in Newark, Delaware.

Schedule

References

Delaware
Delaware Fightin' Blue Hens football seasons
Delaware Fightin' Blue Hens football